Fernando Venâncio (Mértola, Portugal, born 1944) is a Portuguese born writer, intellectual, literary critic, linguist and academic. At present he holds Dutch nationality.

Fernando Venâncio spent his childhood in Lisbon and completed his secondary school in the northern Portuguese city of Braga. He studied Philosophy in Vila Nova de Ourém and Theology in Lisbon. In 1970 he moved to the Netherlands, where he eventually completed his studies in linguistics at the University of Amsterdam in 1976. Two years later, he began lecturing at the department of Portuguese studies in the University of Nijmegen. From 1984 to 1988 he taught at the University of Utrecht, eventually returning to the University of Amsterdam to teach Portuguese language and culture, until today. In 1995 Venâncio completed his doctoral degree with a thesis on Portuguese language. 

He is an accomplished author and a regular contributor to prestigious journals such as Jornal Literário, Ler and Colóquio/Letras, working as a literary critic. He also publishes in the Portuguese newspaper Expresso and in the magazine Visão. Until March 2008, he was a regular contributor in the collective blog Aspirina B. 

Venâncio, although controversial in some issues, has expressed pro-reintegrationism views, referring to the relationship between the Galician and Portuguese languages.

Selected works
 Uma migalha na Saia do Universo, 1997 (poetry collection, translated from Dutch)
 Estilo e Preconceito. A Língua Literária em Portugal na Época de Castilho, 1998 (doctoral thesis, published by Edições Cosmos)
 Um Almoço de Negócios em Sintra, 1999 (translation of the work by Gerrit Komrij)
 Os Esquemas de Fradique, 1999
 Jose Saramago: A Luz e o Sombreado, 2000 
 El-Rei no Porto, 2001 
 Maquinações e Bons Sentimentos, 2002
 Ensaios Literários, 2002
 Quem Inventou Marrocos: Diários de Viagem, 2004
 Último Minuete em Lisboa, 2008.

Notes

External links
 Fernando Venâncio in Aspirina B (in Portuguese)
 Brief bibliography and access to a number of short texts by Fernando Venâncio (in Portuguese)

1944 births
Living people
People from Mértola
Portuguese male writers
Dutch people of Portuguese descent